Alexandra Park is an affluent, leafy residential suburb in the north of Harare, Zimbabwe. The area was developed for servicemen and their families in the post-war years following World War II.

Notable institutions located in Alexandra Park include the National Botanic Garden (Zimbabwe) and National Herbarium; the National Parks and Wildlife services of Zimbabwe; the Zimbabwe Rugby Union; St George's College (private secondary boys school); Alexandra Park Primary School; Hartmann House (private boys primary school); and the Embassy of Bulgaria.

History

The suburb of Alexandra Park was originally set up to address housing shortages after World War II; the government of the time promised servicemen plots of half-acre land once the war was over and Alexandra Park was one of the suburbs in which this land was allocated. Many of the street names reflect significant places or people involved in World War II such as Churchill Avenue, Dunkirk Drive, or Normandy Road.

Alexandra Park includes the following roads and streets: Churchill Avenue, Borrowdale Road; Sam Nujoma Street (formerly Second Street); Sandringham Drive; Kirkwood Road; Maasdorp Avenue; Earls Road; Arundel Road; Fleetwood Road; Normandy Road, Dunkirk Drive; Carlisle Drive; and Clairwood Road.

See also
Mount Pleasant, Harare
Avondale, Harare
Post-war economic boom

Suburbs of Harare